Sarangesa motozioides is a species of butterfly in the family Hesperiidae. It is found in Gabon.

References

Butterflies described in 1892
Celaenorrhinini
Butterflies of Africa